Haripuñjaya (Central and Northern Thai:  , also spelled Haribhuñjaya) was a Mon kingdom in what is now Northern Thailand, existing from the 7th or 8th to 13th century CE. Its capital was at Lamphun, which at the time was also called Haripuñjaya. In 1292 the city was besieged and captured by Mangrai of the Tai kingdom of Lan Na.

Founding
According to the Camadevivamsa and "Jinakalamali" chronicles, the city was founded by a hermit named Suthep in 629 AD, and the Mon ruler of Lavo Kingdom (present-day Lopburi) sent his daughter Jamadevi to become its first queen. However, this date is now considered as too early, and the actual beginning is placed at around 750 AD. At that time, most of what is now central Thailand was under the rule of various Mon city states, known collectively as the Dvaravati kingdom. Queen Jamadevi gave birth to twins, the older succeeding her as the ruler of Lamphun, and the younger becoming ruler of neighboring Lampang.

Flourishing and downfall

The kingdom under King Adityaraja, came into conflict with the Khmers in the twelfth century.  Lamphun inscriptions from 1213, 1218, and 1219, mention King Sabbadhisiddhi endowing Buddhist monuments.

The chronicles say that the Khmer unsuccessfully besieged Haripuñjaya several times during the 11th century. It is not clear if the chronicles describe actual or legendary events, but the other Dvaravati Mon kingdoms did in fact fall to the Khmers at this time. The early 13th century was a golden time for Haripuñjaya, as the chronicles talk only about religious activities or constructing buildings, not about wars. Nevertheless, Haripuñjaya was besieged in 1292 by the Tai Yuan king Mangrai, who incorporated it into his Lan Na ("One Million Rice Fields") kingdom. The plan set up by Mangrai to overpower Haripuñjaya began by dispatching Ai Fa on an espionage mission to create chaos in Haripuñjaya. Ai Fa managed to spread discontent among the population, which weakened Haripuñjaya and made it possible for Mangrai to take the kingdom over. Phraya Yi Ba, the last king of Haripuñjaya, was forced to flee south to Lampang.

List of rulers 
Names of monarchs of the Haripuñjaya kingdom according to Tamnan Hariphunchai (History of Kingdom of Haripuñjaya):
Camadevi 662-669 
Hanayos 669-749
Kumanjaraj 749-789
Rudantra 789-816
Sonamanjusaka 816-846
Samsara 846-856
Padumaraj 856-886
Kusadeva 886-894
Nokaraj
Dasaraj
Gutta
Sera
Yuvaraj
Brahmtarayo
Muksa
Traphaka
Uchitajakraphad, King of Lavo
Kampol
Jakaphadiraj, King of Atikuyaburi
Vasudev
Yeyyala
Maharaj, King of Lampang
Sela
Kanjana
Chilanka
Phunthula
Ditta
Chettharaj 
Jeyakaraj
Phatijjaraj
Thamikaraj
Ratharaj
Saphasith
Chettharaj
Jeyakaraj
Datvanyaraj
Ganga
Siribun
Uthen
Phanton
Atana
Havam
Trangal 1195-1196
Yotta 1196-1270
Yip 1270-1292

Notes

References 

 'Historic Lamphun: Capital of the Mon Kingdom of Haripunchai', in: Forbes, Andrew, and Henley, David, Ancient Chiang Mai Volume 4. Chiang Mai, Cognoscenti Books, 2012. 
 Swearer, Donald K. and Sommai Premchit. The Legend of Queen Cama: Bodhiramsi's Camadevivamsa,   a Translation and Commentary. New York: State University of New York Press, 1998.

Former countries in Thai history
Mon people
Old Cities of Mon people
1st millennium in Thailand
States and territories established in the 8th century
States and territories established in 1292
661 establishments
1290s disestablishments in Asia
7th-century establishments in Thailand
13th-century disestablishments in Thailand
Medieval Thailand
Lamphun province
Former kingdoms